Antikörper (German for Antibody) is the second studio album by the German rock band Eisbrecher, released on 20 October 2006. It debuted on the Media Control Charts at number 85 and on the Deutsche Alternative Charts at number 10.

Track listing 
 "Der Anfang" (The Beginning) – 2:35
 "Adrenalin" (Adrenaline) – 4:02
 "Leider" (Unfortunately) – 4:08
 "Antikörper" (Antibody) – 4:15
 "Entlassen"  (Released) – 4:28
 "Ohne dich"  (Without You) – 4:36
 "Phosphor"  (Phosphorus) – 3:52
 "Kein Mitleid"  (No Sympathy) – 5:30
 "Kinder der Nacht"  (Children of the Night) – 4:18
 "Vergissmeinnicht"  (Forget-me-not) – 3:54
 "Freisturz"  (Free Fall) – 4:57
 "Wie tief?"  (How Deep?) – 4:24
 "Das Ende"  (The End) – 1:49
 "Eiskalt erwischt" (Caught Icecold) (bonus track) – 3:46
 "Vergissmeinnicht" (video) (bonus track) – 4:05
Track 14 is only available on the limited edition and US releases. The "Vergissmeinnicht" video is only available on the limited edition.

Personnel 
 Alexander Wesselsky – vocals
 Noel Pix – instruments
 Max Schauer – keyboards, tracks 1 and 13, additional programming on tracks 2, 4, 7, 10, 12 and 14
 Eric Damköhler – additional guitars on tracks 2–5, 7, 12 and 14
 M. Smart – co-wrote various songs

References 

Eisbrecher albums
2006 albums
AFM Records albums
German-language albums